Edward James Gay (February 3, 1816 – May 30, 1889) was a financier and member of United States Congress. He was born at Liberty, Bedford County, Virginia, in the United States. Gay and his wife Lavinia Hynes were the grandparents of U.S. Senator Edward James Gay.

Early history
His family moved to Illinois in 1820, then four years later to St. Louis, Missouri. For several years he studied under a private teacher in Belleville, Illinois; he attended Augusta College in Kentucky from 1833–34 and returned to St. Louis, where he was engaged in commercial affairs from 1839 to 1860. Although he had no formal business education, Gay was a dedicated student of industrial and political economy from early adulthood.

From St. Louis he moved to Louisiana, where he became interested in manufacturing and planting. He was prominently connected with the erection of the Merchants Exchange Building in St. Louis, and he was the first president of the Louisiana Sugar Exchange of New Orleans.

Gay was originally opposed to secession from the Union, but once the American Civil War began, he stood firmly behind the Southern Confederacy.

Political career

Although not inclined towards politics, Gay was persuaded in 1884 by his friends and associates to run for a seat in the U.S. House of Representatives. He defeated William Pitt Kellogg, the last survivor of carpetbagging in Louisiana, in the election and became a member of the 49th Congress as a Democrat. He was re-elected to the 50th and 51st Congresses.

Gay died at his home, the Saint Louis Plantation in Iberville Parish, on May 30, 1889, while still in office. He was buried at Bellefontaine Cemetery in St. Louis.

His St. Louis Plantation was added to the National Register of Historic Places in 1975.

See also
List of United States Congress members who died in office (1790–1899)
Acadia Plantation, in Lafourche Parish
Magnolia Mound Plantation House, in East Baton Rouge Parish

References

External links

1816 births
1889 deaths
Democratic Party members of the Louisiana House of Representatives
Democratic Party members of the United States House of Representatives from Louisiana
19th-century American politicians
Burials at Bellefontaine Cemetery
Augusta College (Kentucky) alumni